Cas Anvar (born 15 March 1966) is a Canadian actor and writer known for the SyFy/Amazon Prime Video science fiction television series The Expanse.

Early life
Born in Regina, Saskatchewan, to Iranian parents and raised in Montreal, Quebec, Anvar speaks English, French, Persian, and limited Arabic, Hindi, and Spanish.
He graduated from Beaconsfield High in 1983. He stated that he is of Iranian, Lebanese, Indian, and Latino descent.

Career

Anvar stated that after attempts to study psychology and sciences at McGill University he graduated from the National Theatre School in 1989. As Repercussion Theatre's founding Artistic Director, he worked with the company, since 1988 touring parks of Montreal, then North America, with annual Shakespeare in the Park Festival. Meanwhile, he continued performing in theatre and, after debuting in Urban Angel in 1992, in television and film.

Anvar appeared as Dodi Fayed with Naomi Watts in Diana in 2013. 
In a 2013 interview on George Stroumboulopoulos Tonight for CBC, Anvar said: "I have a lot of passion for women's rights, domestic abuse, bullying".

First broadcast in December 2015, Anvar starred in the science fiction television series The Expanse as Alex Kamal.

In 2016, he joined season 3 of The Strain as Sanjay Desai.

In 2019, he had a recurring role on How To Get Away With Murder as Robert Hseih.

Sexual misconduct allegations 
In June 2020, Alcon Entertainment hired an independent firm to investigate over 30 allegations of sexual harassment and assault made against Anvar. In November 2020 Alcon announced that Anvar would not be returning for the sixth and final season of The Expanse.

Filmography

Film

Television

Internet video

Video games

References

External links
 
 

1966 births
Living people
20th-century Canadian male actors
21st-century Canadian male actors
Canadian male film actors
Canadian male television actors
Canadian male video game actors
Canadian male voice actors
Canadian people of Iranian descent
Male actors from Montreal
Male actors from Regina, Saskatchewan